Tech21 can refer to:

 Tech 21, an American manufacturer of guitar and bass effect pedals, amps, and DI boxes
 Tech21 (UK company), a British manufacturer of consumer electronics accessories